Johanna Brenner is an American feminist and sociologist whose writing and thought is in the socialist-feminist vein.

A graduate of Reed College (B.A., 1964) and the University of California, Los Angeles (M.A., 1970; Ph.D., 1979), she spent four years as a telephone installation technician worker in the 1970s. In 1981 she began teaching in the sociology department at Portland State University in Portland, Oregon, where she served from 1982 to 2005 as coordinator of its women's studies program. She is now emeritus professor.

Brenner has contributed to New Left Review, Monthly Review, and other periodicals. In 1993 she worked with Catherine Sameh and Kathryn Tetrick to open In Other Words Women's Books and Resources.

Mike Davis has said, "Johanna Brenner writes with a clarity of purpose that arises out of a lifetime of participation in the struggles of working-class women."

References

Writings
 
 
 
 

American women academics
American sociologists
American women sociologists
American socialists
American socialist feminists
Living people
Portland State University faculty
Reed College alumni
University of California, Los Angeles alumni
California socialists
Oregon socialists
Year of birth missing (living people)
21st-century American women